Gabčíkovo  is a town and municipality in the Dunajská Streda District, in the Trnava Region of southwestern Slovakia. It has 5,232 inhabitants of whom approximately 80% are Hungarians. After the Communist takeover of Czechoslovakia, the city was named after Jozef Gabčík, an important figure in the Czechoslovakian resistance to Nazi occupation.

Name
The Hungarian name of the town was first recorded in 1102 as Beys and preserves the name of its erstwhile Pecheneg inhabitants, pecheneg being besenyő in Hungarian. The town appears in several documents between 1262 and 1274 as a borderguard Pecheneg settlement.

The current Slovak name of the town was given by the authorities in 1948 after Jozef Gabčík, a Slovak soldier involved in Operation Anthropoid, the assassination of Reinhard Heydrich, Deputy Reich-Protector of Bohemia and Moravia.

Geography
Gabčíkovo is situated along the Danube river on the border with Hungary, in the southern part of Great Rye Island around 12 km south of Dunajská Streda bordered by Baka to the west, Vrakúň to the east, Pataš, Baloň, Sap and Ňárad to the southeast, and the Hungarian villages of Lipót and Ásványráró to the southwest.  Administratively, the village belongs to the Trnava Region, Dunajská Streda District.

Near to the village, there is the main part of the Gabčíkovo Waterworks, which is the reason for a long-term dispute between Hungary and the Slovak Republic.

History
In the 10th century, the territory of Gabčíkovo became part of the Kingdom of Hungary. In 1468, Hungarian king Matthias Corvinus gave Gabčíkovo, then known as Bős, the right of organizing a fair. It was part of Hungary and later Austria Hungary until the Treaty of Trianon. No plebiscites were allowed to take place despite the overwhelming majority of the population being Hungarian. 

After the Austro-Hungarian army disintegrated in November 1918, Czechoslovak troops occupied the area, later acknowledged internationally by the Treaty of Trianon. Between 1938 and 1945 Bős once more became part of Miklós Horthy's Hungary through the First Vienna Award. From 1945 until the Velvet Divorce, it was part of Czechoslovakia. Since then it has been part of Slovakia.

Demography
In 1910, it had a population of 2823 of whom 2805 (99.36%) were listed as Hungarians (included Jews and Slovaks in the state service). After the Treaty of Trianon, more Slovaks started to move into the area. As of 2021, the population includes 5,232 inhabitants, of which 4,217 (80.6%) are Hungarians, and 727 (13.9%) are Slovaks.

Genealogical resources

The records for genealogical research are available at the state archive "Statny Archiv in Bratislava, Slovakia"

 Roman Catholic church records (births/marriages/deaths): 1720-1896 (parish A)

Twin towns – sister cities

Gabčíkovois twinned with:
 Enese, Hungary
 Kondoros, Hungary
 Mihăileni, Romania
 Nagymaros, Hungary
 Pázmándfalu, Hungary

References

External links
 Municipal website 
Surnames of living people in Gabcikovo

Villages and municipalities in Dunajská Streda District
Hungarian communities in Slovakia